Different Slanguages is the sixth album by rapper Messy Marv a.k.a. MessCalen.

Track listing

 Intro
 Top of the World
 Bitch Move
 Different Slanguages
 Cuz We Want to (featuring JT The Bigga Figga)
 Black Jesus (featuring Mad Lung)
 It's On (featuring Keak Da Sneak)
 Skit
 Pop That (featuring Billy Cook)
 Stuntin
 Discobayish
 Ko.Alition (featuring Lucci Seigal)
 Kill That Bitch
 It's Krazy (featuring Lucci Seigal)

References
 http://hans-kingofthedrugs.blogspot.com/2009/04/messcalenakamessymarv_08.html

2004 albums
Messy Marv albums